El Paso Patriots was an American soccer team based in El Paso, Texas, United States. Founded in 1989, the team played in the Premier Development League (PDL), the fourth tier of the American Soccer Pyramid, in the Mid South Division of the Southern Conference.

The team played its home games at the soccer-specific Patriot Stadium, where they played since 2005 until 2012, when they played their last season (2013) home schedule at the SAC.  The team's colors were red, navy blue and white.

Prior to their stadium being completed in 2005, the Patriots played at the Sun Bowl Stadium on the campus of the University of Texas at El Paso, and at Dudley Field, the former home of the El Paso Diablos baseball team. They were one of the more long-serving franchises in American soccer, having previously played in the first division A-League until 2003.

History
Founded in 1989 as the El Paso Sixshooters and owned and coached by Dan Guard, the team competed in the Southwest Indoor Soccer League.  In January 1990, the team ceased operations.  The team resumed operations in the fall of 1990 as the El Paso Spurs.  Before the 1991 season, the Spurs were sold to a group which included primary investor Enrique Cervantes as well as Jaime Monardes.  The new ownership group renamed the team the Patriots to capitalize on the Patriot missile's recent success in the Gulf War and hired Brazilian Marinho Chagas as head coach.  In 2003, the team played in the Sun Bowl.

Prior to the 2010 PDL season the Patriots signed a formal agreement with Mexican Premier Division team Guadalajara, and were officially rebranded as the Chivas El Paso Patriots. In addition to cross-promotion, sponsorship and player development, the agreement will also see the U-20, Division 1A and Division II Chivas teams playing regular games in El Paso.  In 2012, the club rebranded to their original name El Paso Patriots.

Players

Notable former players

This list of notable former players comprises players who went on to play professional soccer after playing for the team in the Premier Development League, or those who previously played professionally before joining the team.

  Carlos Kaiser (footballer)
  Ben Everson
  Carlos Farias
  Julio Daniel Frías
  Freddy Juarez
  Cesar Sosa
  Salvador Mercado
  Dimitar Popov
  Steve Sengelmann
  Dimitar Vasev

Year-by-year

Honors
 USL PDL Southern Conference Champions 2005
 USL PDL Mid South Division Champions 2005
 USL PDL Mid South Division Champions 2004
 USISL Pro League South Central Division Champions 1995
 US Open Cup Runners-Up 1995
 USISL Southwest Division Champions 1992

Head coaches
  Dan Guard (1989–1990)
  Marinho Chagas (1991–1992)
 Oscar Lira (1993–1994-1995)
  Francisco Paco Chavez (1996–1999)
  Greg Petersen (2000)
 Alfredo Solares (2001 – interim)
  Carlos Bracamontes (beginning July 2, 2001)
  Tita (2002)
  Miguel Murillo (2002, 2008)
  Fernando Gutierrez (2003)
  Jesus Enriquez (2002–2003-2004–2005–2006)
  Salvador Mercado (2007)
  Javier McDonald (2008 interim)

Stadium
 Sun Bowl Stadium; El Paso, Texas (2003)
 Dudley Field; El Paso, Texas (2004)
 Gary Del Palacios Field (Patriot Stadium); El Paso, Texas (2005–2012)
 SISD Student Activities Complex; El Paso, Texas (2013)

Average attendance
Attendance stats are calculated by averaging each team's self-reported home attendances from the historical match archive at https://web.archive.org/web/20100105175057/http://www.uslsoccer.com/history/index_E.html.

 2005: 1,546 (2nd in PDL)
 2006: 867 (7th in PDL)
 2007: 789 (8th in PDL)
 2008: 1,269
 2009: 607
 2010: 1,069 (8th in PDL)

References

External links

Official Site
Official PDL site

Association football clubs established in 1989
Defunct Premier Development League teams
Soccer clubs in Texas
USISL teams
Indoor soccer clubs in the United States
A-League (1995–2004) teams
1989 establishments in Texas
2013 disestablishments in Texas
Association football clubs disestablished in 2013